Kabiru Tanimu Turaki, SAN, FCIArb, FABs, FCIDA, HCH.Hm, MPIS, MHCA (Dan Masanin Gwandu, Zarumman Kabbi) (born 3 April 1957) is a senior advocate of Nigeria, a former Minister of Special Duties and Intergovernmental Affairs, former supervising Minister, Ministry of Labour, having served from 2013–2015 and 2014–2015 respectively and current Chairman of People's Democratic Party former Ministers’ Forum of Nigeria.

A practicing lawyer and a politician, he contested for Kebbi state governor's seat three times. He is presently a member of People's Democratic Party's board of trustees.

Early life and education 
Kabiru was born in the town of Nasarawa in Kebbi State to the family of Alhaji Tanimu. Like other children of his age, Tanimu was sent to the Qur'anic school. In order to acquire Western education, he was further enrolled into Nasarawa Primary School, Birnin Kebbi, where he was appointed as the deputy head boy and timekeeper of the school.

Turaki attended Barewa College, Zaria, and was the deputy house captain at Suleiman Barau House and president of the Young Farmers' Club.

To further his education, Kabiru went to the College of Arts and Science, Sokoto for his I.J.M.B., and then earned admission into the University of Jos, to read law. He graduated with honour and proceeded to the Nigerian Law School, Lagos where he was called to the Nigerian bar in 1986.

Personal life 
Turaki is married and has children. He is a Muslim, Hausa Fulani from Kebbi state.  He is the first lawyer from Kebbi state and the entire former northwestern states to become a senior advocate.

He was appointed the Dan Masanin Gwandu by the Emir of Gwandu in February, 2002, in celebration of his achievements, and support for the development of his community. He was also conferred with the traditional title of Zarumman Kabi by Argungu Emirate in 2012.

Turaki has been a member of the National Executive Committee of the Nigerian Bar Association, Chairman of the Nigerian Bar Association Committee on the Judiciary, and a member of the Governing Board of the Nigerian Judicial Institute. He was also appointed as the Chairman of the Nigerian Copyright Commission by President Goodluck Jonathan in 2012, a position he held until 2013 when he became a minister in the government of Nigeria with the responsibility of piloting the newly recreated Federal Ministry of Special Duties and Intergovernmental Affairs and as the Honourable Supervising Minister of the Federal Ministry of Labour and Productivity in 2014 and 2015. He was also made the Chairman of the White Paper Committee on the Report of the Presidential Committee of Experts on Interprofessional Relationships in the Public Health Sector. President Jonathan also appointed Turaki as Chairman of the Presidential Committee on Dialogue and Peaceful Resolution of Security Challenges in the North.

Awards 
In recognition of his contributions to the development of Nigeria, Turaki has been honoured with the following honours and awards:
 Honorary Life Member, Law Student Society, Bayaro University, Kano
 Patron, Law Students Society, University of Jos
 Patron, Kebbi State Student Association
 Patron, “Tashi Mana” Theatre, Literacy and Debate Club, Waziri Umaru  Federal Polytechnic, Birnin Kebbi
 Patron, Association of Deaf and Dumb, Kano State Branch
 Patron, Gwandu Emirate Student Association
 Life Patron, National Association of Nigerian Students
 Sheikh Abdullahi Fodio Award
 National Association of Mathematical Science Student of  Nigeria Award of Excellence
 National Association of Kebbi State Students Star Award
 Distinguished Alumnus of the Year Award by SUG, University of Jos
 Distinguished Personality of the Year Award by Law Students, University of Jos
 African Meritorious Service Award for Good Leadership
 Nigerian Youth Ambassador Award
 Arewa Publishers Union Distinguished Merit Award
 BEEMA Communications Ltd. Golden Star Award
 Barewa Old Boys Association Merit Award
 Zenith International Award for Excellence
 Icon of Hope Award by National Association of Polytechnic Students
 Nigerian Bar Association, Kano Branch, Merit Award
 Nigerian Students Merit Award
 Glibalink International Leadership Gold Award
 NYLF Exceptional Leadership Award
 LAWSAN Merit Award
 2009 Kwame Nkrumah Distinguished Leadership Award
 AIDO Communication African Outstanding Leader and Philanthropist Award (Ghana)
 African Role Model Leadership Gold Award for Excellence
 African Credibility Award
 Association of Zamfara, Kebbi and Sokoto States Student Merit Award
 Fellow of the Chartered Institute of Loan and Risk Management of Nigeria Award
 Fellow of the Civilian Institute of Democratic Administration Award
 Distinguished Award by Body of Senior Advocate of Nigeria – Abuja Branch
 Nigeria Union of Local Government Award
 Special Award by Belarusian Security Organization
 Special Recognition Award by BAREWA Old Boys Association National Secretariat
 Special Letter of Commendation for National Service by President Goodluck Ebele Jonathan
 Honorary Doctorate Degree by Gregory University, Abia State 

Turaki loves reading, travelling and sports.

Professional career 
On graduation from the Nigerian Law School, Turaki opted to be a private legal practitioner. Instead of remaining in his hometown, he went to Kano where he became a senior consul with Alhaji Tijjani Abdullahi and Company (Solicitors and Advocates) in 1987. After two years, he formed to K. T. Turaki and Co.

Memberships
Turaki is a member of many professional bodies, including:
 Member, Nigerian Bar Association, 1986
 Member, African Bar Association, 1989
 Member, Commonwealth Lawyers Association, 1990
 Member, International Bar Association, 1992
 Member, National Executive Committee, N.B.A., 1990 – 1995 
 Member, Kano State Law Reporting Committee, 1991
 Member, Body Of Benchers Committee For Resolution Of N.B.A. Crisis, 1992
 Member, Committee For The Review Of Current Legislation, Kano State, 1993
 Member, Committee For Review Of Northern States, Penal Code Law, 1993
 Member, Lawyers In Defence Of Human Rights (N.G.O.), 1995
 Member, Institute Of Industrialists And Corporate Administrators, 2000
 Member, Nigerian Institute Of Public Relations, 2001
 Member Of The Inner Bar, 2002
 Fellow, Chartered Institute Of Arbitrators, 2009
 Member, Body Of Benchers’ Committee For The Reform Of The Laws Regulating The Legal Profession In Nigeria 2010
 Elected Chairman Of The Centennial Class Of The Nigerian Law School, 2010
 Council Member, Section On Legal Practice, Nba, 2012
 Member, Governing Board, National Judicial Institute, 2012
 Chairman, Nigerian Bar Association Committee On The Judiciary, 2012
 Chairman, Nigerian Copyright Commission, 2012
 Member, Committee On The Reconciliation Of E-Payment In Kebbi State, 2012

Political career 
Turaki's political career began during his school years, when he was chairman of the Caretaker Committee of the Students’ Union of SCAS, Sokoto. At the University of Jos, he was a member of the Senate of the National Association of Nigerian Students and a member of the Students’ Representative Assembly of the University and President of the Federated Organisation of Sokoto State Students and President of Birnin Kebbi Youth Association.

After graduating, Turaki continued participating in politics. He was secretary of the Youth Wing of the National Party of Nigeria in 1981. He joined United Nigeria Congress Party in 1996 where he stood as Kebbi State Gubernatorial aspirant for the party. In 1998, Turaki joined All Peoples’ Party where he was member of its National Executive Committee and in 2000 he was elevated to its board of trustees.

However, as the political arena in the country shifted, Turaki decamped to United Nigerian Peoples’ Party and contested for the seat of Kebbi State Governor in 2003. After the 2003 elections, he decamped to People's Democratic Party the same year and was the Party's Kebbi State gubernatorial aspirant in 2007. Following series of betrayals and numerous controversies, Turaki decided to join ACN in 2011. This, however, did not last as he later returned to People's Democratic Party the same year. In 2014/15, Turaki was appointed deputy director general (North) of the People's Democratic Party Presidential Campaign Organization.

National issues

Ministerial appointments 
In 2013, Turaki was chosen by President Goodluck Jonathan for the rebirthing Ministry of Special Duties and Intergovernmental Affairs. The President added the responsibility of Supervising Ministry of Labour and Productivity in 2014. Turaki managed the two ministries until 2015.

Security challenges 
When the need arose to open up dialogue with the Boko Haram insurgents, Turaki was the choice of the federal government and was appointed chairman of the Presidential Committee for Dialogue and Peaceful Resolution of Security Challenges in the North. A committee which for more than two years engaged the insurgents in discussion that saw many leaders of Boko Haram accepting the dialogue option as a means of resolving the insecurity situation in the northeast geo-political zone of Nigeria.

Other contributions 
Turaki was chosen to lead government delegations to Niger, Senegal, and Belarus.

In 2014 he was chosen by President Goodluck Jonathan to serve as the deputy director general of his campaign, and in 2015 was appointed to the board of trustees of the People's Democratic Party.

Controversies

Dialogue with Boko Haram 
On April 24, 2013, President Goodluck Jonathan inaugurated the Presidential Committee on Dialogue and Peaceful Resolution of Security Challenges in the North to be chaired by Turaki. The committee was to open talks with Boko Haram within three months, and work out modalities for an amnesty for the insurgents and compensation for its victims.

The committee immediately began work and was able to engage some Boko Haram leaders and already repentant members into dialogue.

On June 16, 2013, the committee made first public statement detailing how the federal government planned to begin the process of disarmament and deradicalization of Boko Haram members who surrendered their arms as well as ensuring that they were rehabilitated.

On July 11, 2013, the committee announced a ceasefire deal with Boko Haram. Turaki stated that the ceasefire deal had the blessings of Sheikh Abubakar Shekau, the sect's leader. He further gave assurance that all Nigerians would be privy to a ceasefire agreement that would be signed in due course. In his words:

On the terms of the ceasefire agreement, he said it was still being worked on and the broader framework being discussed, after which Nigerians would be duly informed.

However, on July 13, 2013, barely 48 hours after Turaki's statement, Shekau punctured the federal government's claim that the Islamist extremists had agreed to a ceasefire deal in the spirit of Ramadan.

On July 22, 2013, nine days after Shekau released his video, Human Rights Writers’ Association of Nigeria called on President Goodluck Jonathan to immediately disband the Turaki-led committee. The association claimed that it would amount to grave disservice to the public for the committee to continue to exist after Shekau had debunked Turaki's claim that his committee has secured a ceasefire deal with Boko Haram. They further described the exercise as a “huge scam and a scandalous contraption that ought not to have been set up in the first place”. On July 31, 2013, another Pan-Yoruba socio-political organization, Afenifere, called for the immediate disbandment of the committee, saying recent events had overtaken its usefulness. They also called for an urgent probe of Turaki, who was also the Minister of Special Duties, to ascertain where his hoax of a ceasefire came from. Afenifere expressed concerns over renewed violent campaigns by the radical Islamist sect which claimed scores of lives in separate attacks in Borno and Kano States within 48 hours.

However, these calls by the two separate organization felt deaf ears as President Goodluck Jonathan extended the timeline of the committee by two months. Turaki said the discordant tunes coming from the sect represent the various dynamics within them. There are people who are engaged in it on the basis of ideology or dogma. Some people are doing it on the basis of economic benefits. He added that some people are fifth columnists, who will make sure you don't succeed in whatever you do.

After six months, the committee submitted its report to President Jonathan.

Gay marriage rejection 
In August 2013, the Nigerian government rejected gay marriage at the Federal Executive Council despite pressure from the international community to legalize it. Being the minister who gave an insight into how the federal government took the decision, a forum of individuals and organizations who support gay marriage channelled their grievance directly to Turaki. In a statement directly made by Turaki, he said:

“When we were at the Federal Executive Council and we were discussing the issue of gay marriage, we all said that it is very unnatural. How can we explain this to Nigerians? That a man will go and marry a man and a woman will go and marry a fellow woman. Then we also discussed the aspect of the psychological and mental trauma that the children of such union, whether adopted or not, will have to go through. For example when they go to school and they are asked; who are your parents? And they have to answer that their mummy and daddy are both men or are both female. This does not fit into a highly religious society like ours. There is nowhere in the world where God is worshipped like in Nigeria. Even traditional worshippers also take their religion very seriously, we pray a lot and that is why God has not forsaken Nigeria. We have been through situations that saw many counties went into pieces but whatever happens in Nigeria, like an elephant, Nigeria will only shake its body and move on”.

These words did not go well with those individuals and groups who supported gay marriage. They attributed his words as being too religious denial of human rights.

References 

1957 births
Living people
 People from Kebbi State
 University of Jos alumni
 Peoples Democratic Party (Nigeria) politicians
20th-century Nigerian lawyers
 Government ministers of Nigeria
 Nigerian Muslims